Cynthia Johnson is an American entrepreneur, marketing professional, search engine optimization specialist, social media influencer, author and keynote speaker. She is a co-founder of Ipseity Media and previously served as the director of brand development of American Addiction Centers (AAC). She is also a contributing columnist for Entrepreneur, Foxnews, Chicago Tribune and several other industry publications. She is currently member of the Board of Directors for United Nations Women U.S. National Committee, L.A. and Forbes Agency Council. According to Entrepreneur Magazine, Cynthia was one of the 10 Personal Branding Experts to Follow, in 2017.

About
Johnson was previously the educational director and global board member at Social Media Club and is currently a member of Young Entrepreneurs Council, Advisory Board Member for nGage. Social, and committee member for the Charlotte and Gwenyth Gray Foundation to cure Batten Disease.

She was a partner of RankLab which was acquired by American Addiction Centers in 2015. She began serving as the director of brand development of American Addiction Centers in 2015. She is a co-founder of Ipseity Media and also the CEO and co-founder of Bell + Ivy, a digital marketing and personal branding agency in Santa Monica, CA. She is on the advisory board for the Millennium Alliance.

Published works 

 Johnson, Cynthia (2019). Platform: The Art and Science of Personal Branding. New York: Crown Publishers. ISBN 9780399581373.

References

External links

 

Year of birth missing (living people)
Living people
American businesspeople
Social media influencers
American columnists